Moose Lake (Lodge) Airport  is located adjacent to Moose Lake, British Columbia, Canada.

See also
Moose Lake (Lodge) Water Aerodrome

References

Registered aerodromes in British Columbia
Regional District of Bulkley-Nechako